Hafnarfjörður, officially Hafnarfjarðarkaupstaður, is a port town and municipality in Iceland, located about  south of Reykjavík. The municipality consists of two non-contiguous areas in the Capital Region, on the southwest coast of the country. At about 30,000 inhabitants, Hafnarfjörður is the third-most populous city in Iceland after Reykjavík and Kópavogur. It has established local industry and a variety of urban activities, with annual festival events.

Activities
The town is the site of an annual Viking festival, where Viking culture enthusiasts from around the world display reconstructions of Viking garb, handicraft, sword-fighting and longbow shooting. It takes place in June each summer.

Local industry

Just two kilometres outside of Hafnarfjörður is an aluminium smelter, run by Alcan. The smelter was originally built in 1969, and it has improved its cleaning process since then, especially regarding fluoride. Local elections were held in May 2006, where the people of the town voted against extension of the smelter.

History

Hafnarfjörður takes its name (meaning harbour fjord) from the area's excellent natural harbour. The town is built on top of Holocene lava fields erupted from the nearby Krýsuvík volcanic system, including the 8000-year-old Búrfellshraun and the much younger 2000-year-old Óbrinnishólabruni. There have been no new lava flows on the site since before the Settlement of Iceland, but the Krýsuvík system is still an active volcano, last erupting in 2021 at Fagradalsfjall further to the southwest.

Hafnarfjörður is first named in the medieval Landnámabók, and the earliest reports of voyages to Hafnarfjörður date from the end of the 14th century. Englishmen began trading in Hafnarfjörður in the 15th century, but German merchants followed in their wake and eventually drove the English out. In German documents, Hafnarfjörður was mentioned for the first time in 1391, and in another German document dating from 1486 the place was described as a trading place of merchants from Hamburg for the first time. 

The town of Hafnarfjörður became an official member of the Hanseatic League. The first Lutheran church in Iceland was raised at Háigrandi , opposite Óseyri , just outside the small boat harbour in 1533. After that, the Hanseatic traders prevailed in town until 1602, based at Hvaleyri . At this point, the Danish monarchy established a Danish trade monopoly in Iceland which lasted until late in the 18th century. During this period, Hafnarfjörður was the nation's busiest trade centre.

In 1793, Bjarni Sívertsen settled here and became influential in local business and international trade, setting up a major commercial fishing operation. His enterprise and initiative signalled the start of impressive commerce in the town. Ever since, he has been called "the father of Hafnarfjörður" and nicknamed "Sir Bjarni". His house in Vesturgata street, built in 1803, was transformed into a museum (Sívertsenshús). 

Around 1870, dramatic changes took place in Icelandic fishing. Residents followed the growing trend in Iceland of using decked boats rather than row-boats. This led to even more employment and rapid growth, and Hafnarfjörður was the fifth town in Iceland to attain official municipal status in 1908. The first mayor was Páll Einarsson, who later became the mayor of Reykjavík. The first road between Reykjavík and Hafnarfjörður was finished in 1898. The first hydrological power plant in Iceland was built in Hafnarfjörður in 1904.

In 1890 Hafnarfjörður had 616 inhabitants and it was one of the largest towns in Iceland. When Hafnarfjörður attained official municipal status on 1 June 1908 it had 1 400 inhabitants. In 1920 Hafnarfjörður had 2 366 inhabitants, in 1940 3 686, in 1960 7 160 and in 1980 12 312. 

The Coot, Iceland's first trawler, operated from Hafnarfjörður between 1905 and 1908. Its boiler stands by the roundabout on the junction of Reykjavíkurvegur, Strandgata and Vesturgata. A harbour for large commercial ships was raised in 1912, and the first car arrived in 1913.

After World War II, more advanced trawlers and numerous motorised ships were added to the fleet. The town's first stern trawler appeared in 1973. Today, Hafnarfjörður is one of the nation's largest fishing centres and the site of Iceland's first fish wholesalers' auction market. Through the years, Hafnarfjörður's dynamic local economy has been strongly linked to fishing, although freight transport has recently become the major harbour activity. And now, the town is Iceland's second-ranked import and export harbour. Hafnarfjörður is the third largest town of Iceland, after Reykjavík and Kópavogur.

Geography

Climate
The climate in Hafnarfjörður is subpolar oceanic climate (Köppen Cfc).

Local festivals

Bright days
Each year in May, the Bright Days festival is held. The events include short movies, concerts and usually conclude on a day commemorating the sailors of Iceland.

Viking festival
Each year on the summer solstice a Viking festival is held in Hafnarfjörður. A local pub and restaurant, Fjörukráin, started the festival and maintains it to this day.

Sights

There are various old buildings left in the old town centre, e.g. Pakkhúsið , a store house dating from 1865 which houses the Museum of Navigation (Sjóminjasafn Íslands ). Sívertsenshús, an old dwelling house built in 1803, is the oldest building in Hafnarfjörður. It is known by the name Hús Bjarna riddara Sívertsen as well and it was transformed into a museum in 1974. Hafnarfjarðarkirkja , the oldest church in town, was consecrated in 1914. Strandgata  and Fjarðargata  are two old streets in the centre where some historical buildings are preserved. No. 55 of Strandargata is a former wooden store house which was built in 1841 and enlarged in 1880. No. 57 is a wooden residential building dating from 1841.

St. Joseph's Church (Sankti Jósefskirkja ), one of the few Roman Catholic churches in Iceland whose parish was founded in 1926, can be visited in the South of the town centre. Karmelklaustur  is the only Catholic monastery in Iceland. Fríkirkjan í Hafnarfirði  is a Protestant church built in 1913.

Hafnarborg  is a centre of arts and culture where concerts and exhibitions are organized. Hafnarfjörður boasts its own Municipal Theatre, the Icelandic Museum of Films (Kvikmyndasafn Íslands ) and a Museum of Telecommunication (Póst- og Símaminjasafnið ).

Many Icelanders believe in elves and trolls. Hellisgerði  is a small park with lava rocks in the centre of the town which is visited by many people believing that elves and trolls reside there. The northernmost Bonsai trees of the world grow in Hellisgerði as well. Víðistaðatún  is a park in the town centre which is famous for its sculptures created by Icelandic and international well-known artists. Víðistaðakirkja  is a modern church, hemicycle in shape which was inaugurated in the park in 1988. The symbol of Hafnarafjörður is Viti , a lighthouse built around 1900 which can be seen in a residential area on private property.

Swimming pools
Hafnarfjörður has three swimming pools: Suðurbæjarlaug, Ásvallalaug, and Sundhöll Hafnarfjarðar.

Twin towns – sister cities

Hafnarfjörður is twinned with:

 Akureyri, Iceland
 Bærum, Norway
 Cuxhaven, Germany
 Frederiksberg, Denmark
 Hämeenlinna, Finland
 Ilulissat, Greenland
 Juanjui, Peru
 Tartu, Estonia
 Tvøroyri, Faroe Islands
 Uppsala, Sweden

Sports
There are two major sport clubs in Hafnarfjörður:  Fimleikafélag Hafnarfjarðar (FH) and Knattspyrnufélagið Haukar.

FH men's and women's football teams have won several national championships. FH have won the Icelandic Handball league in total of 25 times and have won the cup 6 times which makes them the most successful team competing in Icelandic handball.

Haukar have a magnificent history in handball with many titles. Haukar were champions in 1943, 2000, 2001, 2003, 2004, 2005, 2008, 2009, 2010 and 2015 and cup holders in 1980, 1997, 2001, 2002 and 2010.

Hafnarfjörður also has a gymnastics club, Fimleikafélagið Björk, established on 1 July 1951.

Local swimming club, Sundfélag Hafnarfjarðar (SH), was established on 19 June 1945. The triathlon club 3SH, is part of the club.

Keilir Golf Club is an 18-hole golf club and course located on the Hvaleyri peninsula.

Iceland Cricket opened the world’s northernmost cricket field in 2019 in Hafnarfjörður. At a latitude of 64.07°N, the field broke the record previously held in Umeå, Sweden (63.84°N) by 25km (15.5mi). It was officially inaugurated by Prime Minister of Iceland, Katrín Jakobsdóttir.

In popular culture
In the 1986 novel Red Storm Rising by Tom Clancy, the Soviet Union gains a dramatic strategic advantage at the beginning of the war by seizing Iceland with a Guards Airborne division transported secretly by converted freighters. When the US Marine Corps retake Iceland, they initially land at Hafnarfjörður before advancing on Keflavik. Additionally, in the novella, The Odd Saga of the American and a Curious Icelandic Flock, Snorri calls Alex in the middle of the night to tell him that he is passing through Hafnarfjörður and will be picking him up shortly for a trip to Snæfellsnes.

In 2017 a petition calling upon the Icelandic Prime Minister to erect a statue of Stefán Karl Stefánsson in his hometown of Hafnarfjörður “to forever immortalize and honor his amazing legacy” was created. After his death in 2018, there was a surge of signatures. There are now over 528,000 signatures.

Notable people
Ólafía Einarsdóttir, first Icelander to earn a degree in archaeology
Elin Sigurdardottir, two-time Olympic swimmer and owner of elin.is
Sveinn Eythorsson, guitarist and software developer
Logi Geirsson, former handballer
Ragnheiður Gestsdóttir, children's book author
Rebekka Guðleifsdóttir, photographer, artist
Ólafur Guðmundsson, handball player
Hildur Guðnadóttir, Academy Award-winning composer
Björgvin Halldórsson, musician
Emil Hallfreðsson, footballer who plays for Serie A club Udinese
Geir Hallsteinsson, former handballer
Indie band Jakobínarína
Jóhanna Guðrún Jónsdóttir (Yohanna) was born in Copenhagen but raised in Hafnarfjörður, she was chosen to represent Iceland at the Eurovision Song Contest 2009 in Moscow, Russia with the song "Is It True?", earning her 2nd place
Current home to Magnús Ver Magnússon
Aron Pálmarsson, handballer in THW Kiel
Sesselja Sigmundsdóttir (born Hafnarfjörður 5 July 1902)
Gylfi Sigurðsson, footballer currently plays for English club Everton in the Premier League
Sóley (musician), indie pop singer-songwriter
Stefán Karl Stefánsson, actor, most known for his role as Robbie Rotten on the Icelandic children's TV series, LazyTown

See also
List of cities and towns in Iceland

References

External links

Official website 

 
Populated places in Capital Region (Iceland)
Municipalities of Iceland
Members of the Hanseatic League